= Spy aircraft =

Spy aircraft may refer to:

- Reconnaissance aircraft, using images for later analysis.
- Surveillance aircraft, capturing real-time aerial observation.
